McClenahan is a surname. Notable people with the surname include:

Brian McClenahan (born 1982), American rugby union player
Catherine McClenahan (born 1959), Canadian actress, singer, host and writer
Charles A. McClenahan (born 1941), American politician
Trent McClenahan (born 1985), Australian football (soccer) player

See also
McClenahan House, a historic house in Pittsboro, Chatham County, North Carolina, United States
McClenaghan